Nicholas K. Adjei Kyeremeh is a Ghanaian politician and a member of the Second Parliament of the Fourth Republic representing the Dormaa East Constituency in the Brong Ahafo Region of Ghana. He served one term as a Parliamentarian.

Early life 
Adjei was born in Dormaa East District in the Bono Region of Ghana.

Politics 
Adjei was first elected into Parliament on the ticket of the National Democratic Congress During the 1996 Ghanaian general elections for the Dorma East Constituency in the Brong Ahafo Region of Ghana. He polled 9,103 votes out of the 16,919 valid votes cast representing 36.10% over his opponents Stephen Adoma-Yeboah of the New New Patriotic Party who polled 7,463 votes representing 29.60% and Gyabah Samuel of the People's National Convention who polled 353 votes representing 1.40%.

References 

Year of birth missing (living people)
People from Bono Region
National Democratic Congress (Ghana) politicians
Ghanaian MPs 1997–2001